Pople is a surname.

Pople may also refer to:

 Several nuclear chemistry terms named for John Pople, British theoretical chemist and 1998 Nobel laureate in chemistry
 Pariser–Parr–Pople method, a way of making quantitative predictions of electronic structures
 Pople diagram, a diagram which describes the relationship between various calculation methods in computational chemistry
 Pople-Nesbet equations, a way of describing molecular electron orbits
 Pople notation, a method of notating spin coupling systems in nuclear magnetic resonance
 Pople Hill, a mountain in the Catskills, New York

See also